The Shay Building located at 202 S. Broadway Ave. in Sterling, Kansas, was built in 1906.  It was listed on the National Register of Historic Places in 2010.

It is a two-story corner building at Broadway and Monroe Street in Sterling.

References

Commercial buildings on the National Register of Historic Places in Kansas
Late 19th and Early 20th Century American Movements architecture
Buildings and structures completed in 1906
Rice County, Kansas
1906 establishments in Kansas